Simoca Department is a department in Tucumán Province, Argentina. It has a population of 29,932 (2001) and an area of 1,261 km2. The seat of the department is in Simoca.

Municipalities and communes
Atahona
Buena Vista
Ciudacita
Manuela Pedraza
Monteagudo
Pampa Mayo
Río Chico y Nueva Trinidad
San Pedro y San Antonio
Santa Cruz y La Tuna
Simoca
Villa Chigligasta
Yerba Buena

Notes
This article includes content from the Spanish Wikipedia article Departamento Simoca.

Departments of Tucumán Province